José Antonio Melián (March 19, 1784 - December 1, 1857) was an Argentine colonel. He fought against the British Invasions of the Río de la Plata, and fought alongside José de San Martín in the Argentine War of Independence.  

He was born in Buenos Aires, the son of Tomás Antonio Melián y Betancourt and María Josefa Correa y Lescano, belonging to a noble family of Sevillian and Creole origin. He was married in Santiago to Carmen Ureta, the daughter of Santiago de Ureta and Mercedes de la Banda, belonging to a distinguished Chilean family.

References 

People of the Argentine War of Independence
Argentine colonels
Burials at San José de Flores Cemetery
Patrician families of Buenos Aires
Argentine Army officers
1784 births
1857 deaths